The Togolese Ambassador in Beijing is the official representative of the Government in Lomé to the Government of China.

List of representatives 

 China–Togo relations

References 

China
Togo